Gopalan Ramakrishnan (born 17 November 1940) is a Malaysian boxer. He competed in the men's light welterweight event at the 1964 Summer Olympics.His Grandchild is currently pursuing an education in ACS(I)..

References

1940 births
Living people
Malaysian male boxers
Olympic boxers of Malaysia
Boxers at the 1964 Summer Olympics
Place of birth missing (living people)
Light-welterweight boxers